The National Human Development Reports (NHDR) take the Global Human Development Report approach to the national level and are prepared and owned by national teams. More than 540 national and sub-national HDRs have been produced so far by 135 countries, in addition to 31 regional reports. 

They have introduced the human development concept into national policy dialogue — not only through human development indicators and policy recommendations, but also through the country-led and country-owned process of consultation, research and report writing. Data that is often not published elsewhere, such as statistics disaggregated by geographic location, ethnic group or along rural/urban lines, help pinpoint development gaps, measure progress and flag early warning signs of possible conflict. 

As advocacy tools designed to appeal to a wide audience, the reports also spur lively public debates and mobilize support for action and change. They have helped to articulate people’s perceptions and priorities, as well as serve as a resource of alternate policy opinion for development planning.

See also

 Indices

 American Human Development Index
 Bhutan GNH Index
 Broad measures of economic progress
 Disability-adjusted life year
 Full cost accounting
 Green national product
 Green gross domestic product (Green GDP)
 Gender-related Development Index
 Genuine Progress Indicator (GPI)
 Global Peace Index
 Gross National Happiness
 Gross National Well-being (GNW)
 Happiness economics
 Happy Planet Index (HPI)
 Human Development Index (HDI)
 ISEW (Index of sustainable economic welfare)
 Legatum Prosperity Index
 Leisure satisfaction
 Living planet index
 Millennium Development Goals (MDGs)
 Money-rich, time-poor
 OECD Better Life Index BLI
 Subjective life satisfaction
 Where-to-be-born Index
 Wikiprogress
 World Happiness Report (WHR)
 World Values Survey (WVS)

 Other
 Economics
 Democracy Ranking
 Demographic economics
 Economic development
 Ethics of care
 Human Development and Capability Association
 Human Poverty Index
 Progress (history)
 Progressive utilization theory
 Post-materialism
 Psychometrics
 International Association for Feminist Economics
 International development
 Sustainable development
 System of National Accounts
 Welfare economics

External links
List of National Human Development Reports

Development economics
International development
United Nations Development Programme
Reports